Claudette Tardif (born July 27, 1947) is a Canadian retired senator from Alberta. She was appointed to the senate by Governor General Adrienne Clarkson, on the advice of Prime Minister Paul Martin, on March 24, 2005, representing the Liberal Party of Canada.

Prior to entering the Senate she was a professor and dean at the University of Alberta's French-language faculty, Faculté Saint-Jean. At the time of her appointment, Tardif was vice-president of the University of Alberta. Tardif is also a longstanding advocate of minority language rights, particularly for Alberta's francophone minority.

On January 18, 2007, she was named Deputy Leader of the Opposition in the Senate.

On January 29, 2014, Liberal Party leader Justin Trudeau announced all Liberal Senators, including Tardif, were removed from the Liberal caucus, and would continue sitting as Independents. The Senators refer to themselves as the Senate Liberal Caucus even though they are no longer members of the parliamentary Liberal caucus.

Tardif retired from the Senate on February 2, 2018, five years prior to the mandatory retirement age of 75, in order to spend more time with her family.

References

 
Liberal Party of Canada biography

External links
Claudette Tardif

1947 births
Living people
Liberal Party of Canada senators
Canadian senators from Alberta
Franco-Albertan people
Women members of the Senate of Canada
Women in Alberta politics
21st-century Canadian politicians
21st-century Canadian women politicians